Gisela Menossi (born 1988) is an Argentine beauty pageant titleholder. She participated in the Miss Earth Argentina 2009, an annual national Miss Argentina beauty pageant. She represented her country in the Miss Earth 2009, an annual international beauty pageant promoting environmental awareness and one of the three largest beauty pageants in the world in number of national-level competitions to participate in the world finals.

Miss Earth Argentina
Menossi, from the province of Córdoba, was elected as Miss Argentina Earth 2009 in the Miss Argentina 2009 beauty pageant competition, produced by N-Entertainment, which was held on May 16, 2009, at the Civic Center Plaza, Seca, San Juan, Argentina. The pageant had 24 contestants and was broadcast by Canal 5 Noticias.

Miss Earth 2009
Menossi won the crown and title of Miss Earth Argentina. She represented Argentina but did not place in the ninth edition of Miss Earth beauty pageant, which was held at the Boracay Ecovillage Resort and Convention Center in the Island of Boracay, Philippines on November 22, 2009.

References

1988 births
Living people
Miss Earth 2009 contestants
Argentine beauty pageant winners